Julie Rowe is an author and a self-proclaimed clairvoyant. She claims to have had a near-death experience in 2004, during which she also claims to have had visions pertaining to end-times events.

The LDS Church Education System placed Rowe's book A Greater Tomorrow on a list of spurious materials that was circulated to teachers of high-school seminaries and to college-age Institutes of Religion. The list stated: 
"Although Sister Rowe is an active member of The Church of Jesus Christ of Latter-day Saints, her book is not endorsed by the church and should not be recommended to students or used as a resource in teaching them. The experiences she shares are her own personal experiences and do not necessarily reflect Church doctrine".

In April 2019, Rowe was excommunicated from the Church of Jesus Christ of Latter-day Saints.

In 2020, Rowe emerged into the media spotlight due to her past association with former friend and publisher, Chad Daybell, who was arrested in connection with the deaths of Tylee Ryan and J.J. Vallow.

Selected works 
A Greater Tomorrow (2014)
The Time is Now (2014)
From Tragedy to Destiny (2016)
New Revolution:A Vision of America's Future (2020)

References

External links
 Wasatch Wakeup

21st-century apocalypticists
People excommunicated by the Church of Jesus Christ of Latter-day Saints
Living people
Near-death experiences
Year of birth missing (living people)
American women writers
21st-century American women